Kerin is a surname. Notable people with the surname include:

 John F. Kerin (1944–2006), Australian physician and professor
 John Kerin (born 1937), Australian economist and politician
 Rob Kerin (born 1954), Australian politician
 Zac Kerin (born 1991), American football player

See also
 Kerins